In archaeology and paleontology a faunal assemblage is a group of associated animal fossils found together in a given stratum. 

The principle of faunal succession is used in biostratigraphy to determine each biostratigraphic unit, or biozone.  The biostratigraphic unit being a section of geological strata that is defined on the basis of its characteristic fossil taxa or faunal assemblage.

For example, in East Africa, a distinctive group of animal species, mostly pigs, is characteristic of the fossils preserved from a particular period of time. This faunal assemblage has been used effectively to chronologically correlate the East African early hominid sites.

Faunal assemblages are useful in determining the foraging patterns of hominids. One such assemblage at Lang Rongrien in Thailand indicated a hunter-gatherer group which was highly flexible when it came to finding food. They relied heavily on turtle and tortoise to supply the meat portion of their diet when hunting large game was unpredictable. This assemblage also suggested the paleoenvironment was drier and cooler than today because of a distinct lack of pig bones.

References
 Dawson, Peter Colin (1993) From death assemblage to fossil assemblage understanding the nature of intra-site and inter-site variability in faunal assemblages National Library of Canada, Ottawa,  
 Rogers, Alan R.  (2000) "On Equifinality in Faunal Analysis"  American Antiquity 65(4):  p.709 
 Crabtree, Pam J. (2005) Exploring Prehistory: How archaeology reveals our past McGraw-Hill, Boston p. 450,

External links 
 "A Marine Faunal Assemblage"

Zooarchaeology
Paleozoology
Biostratigraphy
Fossil record
Fossil record of animals